Kolese Loyola, also referred by its acronym LC or Loyola College is a private Catholic secondary school located in Semarang, Central Java, Indonesia. The school was established by the Indonesian Province of the Society of Jesus in 1949. The school's name is derived from its patron saint, St. Ignatius of Loyola.

Mission and aims 
Kolese Loyola's mission is popularly known as 4C: Competence, Conscience, Compassion, and Commitment. Its motto is Ad Maiorem Dei Gloriam (AMDG) or "For the Greater Glory of God" and "Men and Women For Others".

Facilities 
A new building has been used since 2004 with some new facilities, including:
 Physics, chemistry, biology, and computer laboratories
 Sport facilities: a football field, basketball court, tennis court, badminton court, indoor and outdoor volleyball court, athletic equipment, and others
 Multimedia-equipped rooms
 Cafeteria
 Library
 As a Catholic school, Kolese Loyola has a chapel that is used to hold daily and Sunday Masses
 An amphitheatre for special occasions
 A lounge built for KEKL (Keluarga Eks Kolese Loyola / Alumni)

Loyola College anthem 
Kolese kita Loyola perguruan tercipta(Our college, Loyola, created university)

Mengasuh manusia sejati(Minding and teaching true humans)

Menuju jiwa yang jujur(To the souls of honesty)

Cinta ilmu, olahraga, seni, dan budaya(Loving educations, sports, arts, and cultures)

Pikiran dan kehendak hati di latih secara teratur(Mind and will are trained regularly)

Arah tujuan praputra murni penuh susila(Human's directions that’s pure and full of decency)

Mengabdi bangsa karna Tuhan(Serving the nation for God)

Negara adil dan makmur(Fair and prosperous country)

Cinta bangsa sluruh nusa penuh cita-cita(Love the homeland's nation, full of ideals)

Slamanya kita usahakan supaya berbudi yang luhur(Forever we strive so that we have a noble virtue)

Notable alumni

 Jubing Kristianto, Indonesian guitarist, winner of Distinguished Award at Yamaha Guitar Fest in 1984 (Southeast Asia)
 Garin Nugroho, Indonesian film director
 Christianto Wibisono, Indonesian business analyst
 Purnomo Yusgiantoro, Indonesia's Minister of Defense (2004-2009, 2009–present)

See also

 Education in Indonesia
 List of Jesuit schools
 List of schools in Indonesia

References

External links 
  Loyola College's Website

Educational institutions established in 1949
Jesuit secondary schools in Indonesia
1949 establishments in Indonesia
Buildings and structures in Semarang
Education in Central Java